Andreas Wagenhaus (born 29 October 1964) is a German former professional footballer who played as a defender.

Wagenhaus played in each of the first two levels of the East and unified German Football league pyramid at least 50 matches.

In the last year of the East Germany national team he won three caps.

Honours
Dynamo Dresden
 DDR-Oberliga: 1989, 1990
 FDGB-Pokal: 1990
 UEFA Cup semi-finalist 1989
 Deutschland Cup: 1990

Fenerbahçe
 Süper Lig runners-up: 1993–94
 Başbakanlık Kupası: 1993

References

External links
 
 
 

1964 births
Living people
German footballers
East German footballers
East Germany international footballers
German expatriate footballers
Association football defenders
Hallescher FC players
Dynamo Dresden players
Fenerbahçe S.K. footballers
SV Waldhof Mannheim players
FC Gossau players
VfL Halle 1896 players
Bundesliga players
Süper Lig players
Expatriate footballers in Turkey
DDR-Oberliga players